Under the Table and Dreaming is the debut studio album from Dave Matthews Band, released on September 27, 1994. The album's first single was "What Would You Say", featuring John Popper of Blues Traveler on harmonica. Two other singles from the album followed, "Ants Marching" and "Satellite". By March 16, 2000, the album had sold six million copies, and was certified 6× platinum by the RIAA.

Recording
The acoustic guitar tracks on the album were played by Dave Matthews and Tim Reynolds. During the recording sessions, Matthews and Reynolds would sit face-to-face with a piece of glass between them, playing the same guitar part. This was done twice for each song, resulting in four acoustic guitar tracks (two from Matthews, two from Reynolds) all playing the same part on each song. Producer Steve Lillywhite frequently turned the volume down on Matthews' parts and turned the volume up on Reynolds' parts, resulting in Reynolds' guitar playing being more prominent on the final album. Reynolds then overdubbed additional acoustic and electric guitar parts.

Matthews has stated during performances that the harmonica solo performed by John Popper on "What Would You Say" was done in only five to ten minutes, while Matthews was in the bathroom.

One of Dave Matthews Band's most popular live songs, "Granny", was recorded in the studio sessions for this album and was originally intended to be the first single before being cut from the album.

"#34" is the only instrumental track on the album although it was played live with lyrics on nine occasions in 1993, prior to the band taking it to the studio. The band originally recorded the song with lyrics, but they were removed from the final album cut. On some pressings of the album there are 22 blank tracks between "Pay for What You Get" and "#34", so that the latter appears as track number 34. Other pressings simply have the 12th track pre-pended by a period of silence.

The album's title comes from a lyric of the song "Ants Marching": "[He] remembers being small / playing under the table and dreaming".

The album was dedicated "In memory of Anne" for Matthews' older sister Anne, who was killed by her husband in 1994 in a murder–suicide. Included in the jewel case packet is a picture of Dave Matthews and one of Anne's children.

Track listing

Note: Original CD editions of the album include 21 tracks of silence between "Pay for What You Get" and "#34".

Songs cut from the album
Songs that were recorded during the sessions, but weren't included on the final cut:
"Granny" – Matthews wanted this to be the band's first single, but the song never made it to any of the studio albums; nonetheless, the song remains a strong fan favorite and is played to this day, also appearing on 19 live releases by the band. A studio version of this track is included on the 2014 reissue of the album.
"Say Goodbye" – More than likely not recorded during a full-band session. The song was later released on the next album, Crash.
"Let You Down" – Was probably the only original song written in the studio, although it may have not even made a demo. The song was also later released on the next album, Crash.
"Get in Line" – the song was played regularly during the 1994 support tour for the album, but later was abandoned by the band completely.
"Kind Intentions" (also known as #32) – the song first appeared as a demo recording, made by the band in 1991–1993, but never appeared as a studio version or a full song during the known live performances.

Personnel
Dave Matthews Band
Carter Beauford – drums, percussion, vocals
Stefan Lessard – bass guitar
Dave Matthews – vocals, acoustic guitar, design assistant
LeRoi Moore – alto, soprano, and tenor saxophone; vocals; flute
Boyd Tinsley – acoustic violin, vocals

Additional musicians
Tim Reynolds – acoustic guitar
John Popper – harmonica on "What Would You Say"
John Alagía, Michael McDonald, Andrew Page, Jeff Thomas  – additional vocals on "Dancing Nancies" and "What Would You Say"
Steve Forman – additional percussion on "Typical Situation"

Technical personnel
Steve Lillywhite – producer
Chris Dickie – engineer
Andrew Page – assistant engineer
Tom Lord-Alge – mixing engineer
Rory Romano – mixing assistant
Dave Betancourt – mixing assistant
Ted Jensen – mastering
Thane Kerner – art direction, design
Stuart Dee – photography
Sam Erickson, Christopher Bunn, Will Kerner, Taylor Crothers – additional photography

Charts

Weekly charts

Year-end charts

Certifications

References

Dave Matthews Band albums
RCA Records albums
1994 debut albums
Albums produced by Steve Lillywhite